Amsale Woldegibriel (born 8 October 1960) is an Ethiopian middle-distance runner. She competed in the women's 1500 metres at the 1980 Summer Olympics.

References

1960 births
Living people
Athletes (track and field) at the 1980 Summer Olympics
Ethiopian female middle-distance runners
Olympic athletes of Ethiopia
Place of birth missing (living people)